Katherine S. Kazarian (born June 25, 1990 in East Providence, Rhode Island) is an American politician and a Democratic member of the Rhode Island House of Representatives representing District 63 since January 1, 2013. She became House Majority Whip in January 2021.

Education
Kazarian graduated from St. Mary Academy Bay View in 2008 and earned her bachelor's degree in urban studies and economics from Barnard College in 2012.

Elections
2012 When District 63 Democratic Representative Roberto DaSilva ran for Rhode Island Senate and left the seat open, Kazarian ran in the four-way September 11, 2012 Democratic Primary, winning with 829 votes (36.7%) and won the November 6, 2012 General election with 4,227 votes (69.7%) against Independent candidate David Sullivan.

References

External links
Official page at the Rhode Island General Assembly
Campaign site

Katherine Kazarian at Ballotpedia
Katherine S. Kazarian at the National Institute on Money in State Politics

1990 births
Living people
Barnard College alumni
Democratic Party members of the Rhode Island House of Representatives
People from East Providence, Rhode Island
Politicians in East Providence, Rhode Island
Women state legislators in Rhode Island
21st-century American politicians
21st-century American women politicians